Pomponio Cecci (Pomponio Ceci de Lellis) (died 1542) was an Italian Roman Catholic bishop and cardinal.

Biography

A native of Rome, Pomponio Cecci, he studied science, philosophy, and astronomy.  He was a canon of the cathedral chapter of the Archbasilica of St. John Lateran.

On 12 August 1538 he was elected Bishop of Orte e Civita Castellana. He was transferred to the Diocese of Nepi-Sutri on 24 November 1539. He also served as Vicar-General of Rome from 1540 to 1542.

Pope Paul III made him a cardinal priest in the consistory of 2 June 1542. He received the red hat and the titular church of San Ciriaco alle Terme Diocleziane on 12 June 1542.

He died in Rome on 4 August 1542. He is buried in the family chapel in the Archbasilica of St. John Lateran.

References

1542 deaths
16th-century Italian cardinals
Year of birth unknown
16th-century Italian Roman Catholic bishops